Jamie Bulloch (born 6 September 1969) is a British historian and translator of German literature.

Life and work
Jamie was born at East Dulwich Hospital, London, in 1969 and grew up in Tooting.  He first attended Rosemead School, then Whitgift School, where he opened the bowling for the 1st XI. In 1981 he performed with the Children’s Music Theatre (now National Youth Music Theatre) at the Edinburgh Fringe in a production directed by Jeremy James Taylor, which was also filmed for Granada Television the same year. He returned to the Fringe in 1983 and 1989, appearing latterly in Silver, written by Jonathan Smith and directed by Anthony Seldon.

After taking a first in Modern Languages at Bristol University, he obtained an MA with distinction in Central European History at the School of Slavonic and East European Studies (SSEES). He took a couple of years out from studying to teach French and German at St Dunstan's College in London, then resumed with a PhD in interwar Austrian history, in which he was supervised by Martyn Rady. He taught German language and Central European History at SSEES, UCL, King's College London and Warwick University, and he is the author of a book on Karl Renner in the 'Makers of the Modern World' series.

Recent translations include Walk me Home by Sebastian Fitzek (Head of Zeus), Hinterland by Arno Geiger (Picador), Love in Five Acts by Daniela Krien (MacLehose Press), Sleepless by Romy Hausmann (Quercus Books) and The Capital by Robert Menasse (MacLehose Press), which won the 2017 German Book Prize. His best known work is Look Who's Back by Timur Vermes (MacLehose Press), which was longlisted for the 2016 IMPAC award and 2015 Independent Foreign Fiction Prize. His translation of Portrait of the Mother as a Young Woman was praised by the Times Literary Supplement. He and his wife, Katharina Bielenberg, jointly translated Daniel Glattauer's hit novel, Love Virtually, and its sequel, Every Seventh Wave, both of which were adapted into radio plays starring David Tennant and Emilia Fox. His translation of The Mussel Feast won the 2014 Schlegel-Tieck Prize, an award for which he has been runner-up on two further occasions. He also had two books on the shortlist for the 2021 Schlegel-Tieck Prize. Zen and the Art of Murder was shortlisted for the 2018 Crime Writers Association International Dagger.

Personal life

Jamie and Katharina live in London with their three daughters. His father was the British actor Jeremy Bulloch, best known for his portrayal of Boba Fett in the Star Wars films. His brother Robbie portrayed Matthew of Wickham in Robin of Sherwood. His aunt Sally Bulloch was a child actress and had roles in several films including The Pure Hell of St Trinians. She latter became the Executive Manager at The Athenaeum Hotel in Piccadilly.

Bibliography

As author

 Karl Renner: Austria (Haus Publishing, 2009)

As translator

 The Sweetness of Life, Paulus Hochgatterer (MacLehose Press, 2008)
 Ruth Maier's Diary, Ruth Maier (Harvill Secker, 2009)
 Englischer Fussball, Raphael Honigstein (Yellow Jersey Press, 2009)
 Portrait of the Mother as a Young Woman, F.C. Delius (Peirene Press, 2010)
 Love Virtually, Daniel Glattauer (MacLehose Press, 2011)∗
 The Mattress House, Paulus Hochgatterer (MacLehose Press, 2012)
 Mesmerized, Alissa Walser (MacLehose Press, 2012)
 Sea of Ink, Richard Weihe (Peirene Press, 2012)
 The Taste of Apple Seeds, Katharina Hagena (Atlantic Books, 2013)
 Every Seventh Wave, Daniel Glattauer (MacLehose Press, 2013)∗
 The Mussel Feast, Birgit Vanderbeke (Peirene Press, 2013)
 The Chef, Martin Suter (Atlantic Books, 2013)
 Someday We'll Tell Each Other Everything, Daniela Krien (MacLehose Press, 2013)
 Four Meditations on Happiness, Michael Hampe (Atlantic Books, 2014)
 Look Who's Back, Timur Vermes (MacLehose Press, 2014)
 Forever Yours, Daniel Glattauer (MacLehose Press, 2014)
 Raw Material, Jörg Fauser (Clerkenwell Press, 2014)
 Schlump, Hans Herbert Grimm (Vintage Classics, 2015)
 A Very Special Year, Thomas Montasser (Oneworld Publications, 2016)
 Montecristo, Martin Suter (No Exit Press, 2016)
 The Girl Who Beat ISIS, Farida Khalaf and Andrea C. Hoffmann (Square Peg, 2016)
 The Empress and the Cake, Linda Stift (Peirene Press, 2016)
 Kingdom of Twilight, Steven Uhly (MacLehose Press, 2017)
 The Last Summer, Ricarda Huch (Peirene Press, 2017)
 Gunning for Greatness: My Life, Mesut Özil with Kai Psotta (Hodder & Stoughton, 2017)
 Zen and the Art of Murder, Oliver Bottini (MacLehose Press, 2018)
 Damnation, Peter Beck (Point Blank, 2018)
 One Clear, Ice-Cold January Morning at the Beginning of the Twenty-First Century, Roland Schimmelpfennig (MacLehose Press, 2018)
 Elefant, Martin Suter (4th Estate, 2018)
 A Summer of Murder, Oliver Bottini (MacLehose Press, 2018)
 The Capital, Robert Menasse (MacLehose Press, 2019)
 You Would Have Missed Me, Birgit Vanderbeke (Peirene Press, 2019)
 The Dance of Death, Oliver Bottini (MacLehose Press, 2019)
 The Hungry and the Fat, Timur Vermes (MacLehose Press, 2020)
 Dear Child, Romy Hausmann (Quercus Books, 2020)
 The Day My Grandfather Was a Hero, Paulus Hochgatterer (MacLehose Press, 2020)
 The Package, Sebastian Fitzek (Head of Zeus, 2020)
 Passenger 23, Sebastian Fitzek (Head of Zeus, 2021)
 Love in Five Acts, Daniela Krien (MacLehose Press, 2021)
 Sleepless, Romy Hausmann (Quercus Books, 2021)
 Night Hunters, Oliver Bottini (MacLehose Press, 2021)
 Alice's Book: How the Nazis Stole My Grandmother's Cookbook, Karina Urbach (MacLehose Press, 2022)
 Hinterland, Arno Geiger (Picador, 2022)
 Walk me Home, Sebastian Fitzek (Head of Zeus, 2022)

∗Jointly translated with Katharina Bielenberg

Awards and nominations

 2021: Two books shortlisted for the Schlegel-Tieck Prize (The Hungry and the Fat and The Day My Grandfather Was a Hero)
 2020: Runner-up in the Schlegel-Tieck Prize (You Would Have Missed Me)
 2020: Shortlisted for the Oxford-Weidenfeld Prize (You Would Have Missed Me)
 2018: Shortlisted for the Crime Writers' Association International Dagger (Zen and the Art of Murder)
 2014: Winner of the Schlegel-Tieck Prize (The Mussel Feast)
 2014: Runner-up in the Independent Foreign Fiction Prize (The Mussel Feast)
 2013: Runner-up in the Schlegel-Tieck Prize (Sea of Ink)

References
Footnotes

Citations

21st-century British historians
German–English translators
Living people
Academics of King's College London
School of Slavonic and East European Studies
21st-century British translators
Alumni of the University of Bristol
Alumni of the UCL School of Slavonic and East European Studies
1969 births